Sirf Tum is a 1999 Indian Hindi romance film directed by Agathian. It was released on 4 June 1999. The film features Sanjay Kapoor, Priya Gill, Sushmita Sen, Jackie Shroff and Mohnish Behl. The movie was filmed in Nainital, Kerala and Houston. It is a remake of the 1996 Tamil film Kadhal Kotta.Then in Bengle this movie was made again in 1998 in tha name of'Hothat Brishti'..

Plot
Deepak Rai (Sanjay Kapoor) comes across a purse that contains educational certificates belonging to a woman named Aarti (Priya Gill). He finds out that this lady lives in Nainital and mails her stuff back to her, this starts an enduring correspondence through letters.

Even though the couple has never seen each other, there is a mutual attraction. Aarti's sister and brother-in-law Nirmal (Tej Sapru) are encouraging to a certain extent. While Nirmal suggests she marry a Mr. Prem (Salman Khan), a renowned young businessman in his neighborhood and business-partner, Aarti's older sis wants Aarti to choose her own life partner.

One day, Aarti starts out on her journey to locate and meet Deepak without informing him that she is on her way. He is currently living in Delhi as he has a job contract with his boss Neha there temporarily. Not helping matters is Neha (Sushmita Sen), who is Deepak's boss and romantically inclined to him too, but Deepak is not. His heart pines for Aarti. Due to this reason, he resigns and desperate to make ends meets, starts to drive an auto rickshaw at the behest of Pritam (Jackie Shroff) whom he befriended when he respected him as a human when he first arrived in Delhi and Pritam helped him when he did not have a place of his own.

During the correspondence, a few months back, Aarti had gifted Deepak a woolen sweater with an image of a "lighted diya" knitted over it. When Aarti arrives at Delhi, she looks for Deepak's address and workplace hoping she can meet him unaware and surprise him with her presence and see what he is really like. She fails to find Deepak and decides to go back because a week had passed and time was running out. She might not get a chance to come and meet him again. Sadly, she reaches the train station to return home.

Unbeknownst, when Aarti first arrived in Delhi and her rickshaw broke down, she had hired Deepak's auto and had been traveling with him the whole day. While Deepak drops her at the station, someone mistakenly spills coffee over Deepak's shirt. Deepak removes his shirt revealing the woolen sweater beneath. Aarti recognizes it, calls out his name and both recognize each other and how they had been looking for each other the whole time.

The movie ends with Aarti and Deepak embracing each other while Pritam and Jency (Jaya Bhattacharya) look at them in joy.

Cast
 Sanjay Kapoor as Deepak
 Priya Gill as Aarti
 Sushmita Sen as Neha
 Jackie Shroff as Pritam
 Jaya Bhattacharya as Jency
 Mohnish Behl as Ranjit
 Kader Khan as Phone Booth Operator
 Johnny Lever as Niranjan
 Shobha Khote as Hostel Warden
 Tej Sapru aa Nirmal 
 Shagufta Ali as Bharti 
 Deepshikha as Dancer in song "Kabhi To Kudi Phans Jayegi"
 Gurdas Maan as Himself in song "Kabhi To Kudi Phans Jayegi"
 Salman Khan as Prem (Special appearance)

Soundtrack
All songs are composed by Nadeem-Shravan, with lyrics penned by Sameer. Cassettes and CDs are available on T-Series and Eros Music. 

The Sirf Tum soundtrack album sold 2.2million units, and was ninth best-selling Bollywood music album of 1999. "Dilbar" was remade in Satyameva Jayate, where it was recreated by Neha Kakkar.

References

External links
 

Films scored by Nadeem–Shravan
Films shot in Houston
1990s Hindi-language films
1999 films
Hindi remakes of Tamil films
Indian romantic drama films
Films directed by Agathiyan
1999 romantic drama films